The 2011 Speedway Grand Prix of Great Britain, also known as the 2011 FIM Doodson British Speedway Grand Prix for sponsorship reasons, was the fifth race of the 2011 Speedway Grand Prix season. It took place on 25 June at the Millennium Stadium in Cardiff, Great Britain.

Riders 
The Speedway Grand Prix Commission nominated Scott Nicholls as Wild Card, and Tai Woffinden and Ben Barker both as Track Reserves. Because Artem Laguta did not have a valid visa, he could not enter into the United Kingdom. He was replaced by first Qualified Substitutes, Magnus Zetterström of Sweden. Another Russian rider, Emil Sayfutdinov, has Polish citizenship also. The Draw was made on 24 June by the Jury President, Armando Castagna.
 (13)  Artem Laguta → (19)  Magnus Zetterström

Results 
The Grand Prix was won by Greg Hancock who beat Nicki Pedersen, Chris Holder and Emil Sayfutdinov in the final. Hancock becoming World Championship leader.

Heat details

Heat after heat 
 (56,2) Crump, Zetterström, Harris, Nicholls
 (56,0) Gollob, Hancock, Bjerre, Holta
 (56,1) Pedersen, Kołodziej, Hampel, Sayfutdinov
 (56,7) Lindbäck, Jonsson, Lindgren, Holder
 (56,3) Kołodziej, Nicholls, Holta, Lindbäck
 (56,0) Bjerre, Sayfutdinov, Holder, Harris
 (56,9) Zetterström, Pedersen, Lindgren, Gollob
 (56,6) Hancock, Jonsson, Hampel, Crump
 (56,2) Pedersen, Bjerre, Jonsson, Nicholls
 (57,0) Harris, Lindgren, Holta (Fx), Hampel (X)
 (56,1) Holder, Kołodziej, Hancock, Zetterström
 (56,7) Sayfutdinov, Crump, Gollob, Lindbäck
 (55,6) Holder, Nicholls, Gollob, Hampel
 (56,3) Hancock, Pedersen, Harris, Lindbäck
 (56,3) Sayfutdinov, Zetterström, Jonsson, Holta
 (56,7) Bjerre, Crump, Lindgren, Kołodziej
 (56,0) Hancock, Sayfutdinov, Nicholls, Lindgren (X)
 (56,8) Jonsson, Gollob, Harris, Kołodziej
 (56,0) Hampel, Bjerre, Zetterström, Lindbäck
 (56,4) Holder, Woffinden, Crump, Holta (Pedersen - R)
 Semi-Finals:
 (55,6) Sayfutdinov, Hancock, Jonsson, Crump
 (55,3) Holder, Pedersen, Zetterström, Bjerre (R)
 the Final:
 (55,8) Hancock, Pedersen, Holder, Sayfutdinov (Fx)

The intermediate classification

References

See also 
 motorcycle speedway

Speedway Grand Prix of Great Britain
Great Britain
2011
Speedway Grand Prix of Great Britain 2011
2011 in Welsh sport
2010s in Cardiff